The 1979 Mr. Olympia contest was an IFBB professional bodybuilding competition held Saturday October 6 and Sunday October 7, 1979 at Veterans Memorial Auditorium in Columbus, Ohio.

Results

The total prize money awarded was $50,000.

Over 200lbs

Under 200lbs

Overall winner

Notable events

Frank Zane won his third consecutive Mr. Olympia title
 This was the last year the Mr. Olympia contest used weight divisions to determine an overall winner

References

External links 
 Mr. Olympia

 1979
1979 in American sports
1979 in bodybuilding